Bellium is a genus of flowering plants in the daisy family, Asteraceae, native to the Mediterranean region.

 Species
 Bellium bellidioides L. - Balearic Islands, Corsica, Sardinia
 Bellium crassifolium Moris	 - Sardinia
 Bellium minutum (L.) L. - Greece, Turkey, Cyprus, Malta, Sicily
 Bellium nivale Req. - Corsica

References

Astereae
Asteraceae genera